Louis Charles Bechtle (born December 14, 1927) is a former United States district judge of the United States District Court for the Eastern District of Pennsylvania.

Education and career

Born on December 14, 1927, in Philadelphia, Pennsylvania, Bechtle was in the United States Army from 1946 to 1947, then received a Bachelor of Science degree from Temple University in 1951 and a Bachelor of Laws from Temple University Beasley School of Law in 1954. He was an Assistant United States Attorney in Philadelphia from 1956 to 1959. He was in private practice in Philadelphia from 1959 to 1962, and in Norristown, Pennsylvania from 1962 to 1969. He was the United States Attorney for the Eastern District of Pennsylvania from 1969 to 1972.

Federal judicial service

On February 14, 1972, Bechtle was nominated by President Richard Nixon to a seat on the United States District Court for the Eastern District of Pennsylvania vacated by Judge John W. Lord Jr. Bechtle was confirmed by the United States Senate on March 2, 1972, and received his commission on March 7, 1972. He served as Chief Judge from 1990 to 1993, assuming senior status on April 30, 1993, and retiring from the bench entirely on June 30, 2001.

References

Sources

1927 births
Living people
Lawyers from Philadelphia
Military personnel from Philadelphia
Temple University Beasley School of Law alumni
Judges of the United States District Court for the Eastern District of Pennsylvania
United States district court judges appointed by Richard Nixon
20th-century American judges
United States Army soldiers
United States Attorneys for the Eastern District of Pennsylvania
Assistant United States Attorneys